Osborne Lloyd Iceton (30 March 1920 – June 1994) was a footballer who played as an outside left for Preston North End, Carlisle United and Tranmere Rovers.

Born in Workington, Iceton signed for Preston North End in May 1938 but did not represent them before the Second World War. During the war, he played as a wartime guest player for Liverpool, Leeds United, Nottingham Forest and Notts County. In October 1946, Iceton joined Carlisle United where he was renowned for his powerful shooting; in 2009, he was voted Carlisle's 96th best ever player.

In June 1950, Iceton moved to Tranmere Rovers. He made a total of 153 appearances – 140 in the English Football League – scoring 22 goals, before retiring in 1955. Iceton died in June 1994, and his remains were scattered on the Prenton Park pitch.

References

1920 births
1994 deaths
Sportspeople from Workington
Preston North End F.C. players
Carlisle United F.C. players
Tranmere Rovers F.C. players
Liverpool F.C. wartime guest players
Leeds United F.C. wartime guest players
Nottingham Forest F.C. wartime guest players
Notts County F.C. wartime guest players
Association football wingers
English Football League players
English footballers
Footballers from Cumbria